Islas del Cisne Airport  is an airport serving the Swan Islands (Islas del Cisne), Honduras.

Approach and departure are over the water. The Islas del Cisne non-directional beacon (ident: SWA) is just off the western end of the runway. A small Honduran naval garrison maintains the facility.

See also

 Transport in Honduras
 List of airports in Honduras

References

External links
 Islas del Cisne
 OpenStreetMap - Islas del Cisne
 OurAirports - Islas del Cisne

Airports in Honduras
Swan Islands, Honduras